Juliann is a given name. Notable people with the name include:

 Juliann Bluitt Foster (1938–2019), American dentist
 Juliann Graham (1915–1935), American church choir singer and actress

See also
 Julian (given name)
 Juliana
 Julianne

Feminine given names